Ricardo Greer (born August 18, 1977) is a Dominican-American former professional basketball player who is currently an assistant coach at the University of Dayton.

National team career
Greer was part of the Dominican Republic national team from 1999 to 2009 helping the team at the 1999 and 2009 FIBA Americas Championships as well as the 2002 Caribebasket tournament.

Awards and honors
 2× French Pro A Champion: 2005, 2008
 French National Cup Winner: (2007)
 French Pro A Foreign MVP (2010)
 French Pro A Final MVP (2005)
 3× French Pro A "Foreign" First Team: 2005, 2008, 2010
 BBL First Team: 2004
 5× LNB All-star''': 2002, 2005, 2006, 2007, 2009

Off the court
Ricardo has a son named RJ. Greer. Ricardo has a younger brother, Jeff Greer, who also played in French Pro A League and for the Dominican Republic national team.

References

External links
  Ricardo Greer at lnb.fr
 Ricardo Greer at euroleague.net
 Ricardo Greer at draftexpress.com

1978 births
Living people
American expatriate basketball people in Croatia
American expatriate basketball people in the Dominican Republic
American expatriate basketball people in France
American expatriate basketball people in Ukraine
American expatriate basketball people in the United Kingdom
American men's basketball players
Basketball players from New York City
BC Kyiv players
BCM Gravelines players
Cheshire Academy alumni
Dayton Flyers men's basketball coaches
Dominican Republic expatriate basketball people in France
Dominican Republic expatriate basketball people in Ukraine
Dominican Republic men's basketball players
Élan Béarnais players
George Washington Educational Campus alumni
KK Zadar players
London Towers players
Pittsburgh Panthers men's basketball players
SIG Basket players
SLUC Nancy Basket players
Small forwards
STB Le Havre players